Michael Kopsa (January 22, 1956 – October 23, 2022) was a Canadian actor.

Kopsa was best known for his role as Char Aznable in the English dub of Mobile Suit Gundam and for his role as Commander Volcott O'Huey in Galaxy Angel. He also provided the voice of Beast in X-Men: Evolution. He provided the voice of Roger Baxter in Littlest Pet Shop. He also appeared on the science fiction TV series Stargate SG-1 on several occasions, as well as The X-Files, The Net, and The Outer Limits. In the fourth and fifth season of Fringe, he played the recurring Observer villain Captain Windmark. Kopsa also appeared as Andrew McAndrick in Hallmark's series Finding Father Christmas, Engaging Father Christmas, and Marrying Father Christmas.

He was married to actress Lucia Frangione and they had one daughter Nora. On October 23, 2022, Kopsa died of complications from a brain tumor at the age of 66.

Filmography

Anime
 Mobile Suit Gundam (1979-1980, TV series) - Char Aznable
 Mobile Suit Gundam: Char's Counterattack (1988) - Char Aznable
 Jin-Roh: The Wolf Brigade (1999) - Hajime Handa
 Galaxy Angel (2001, TV series) - Commander Volcott O'Huey
 Dragon Ball Z (2001-2003, TV series) - Yakon (Ocean Group Dub)
 MegaMan NT Warrior (2002, TV series) - LaserMan.EXE / Pharaohman.EXE
 Inuyasha (2003, 2006) - Goshinki, Byakko, Mezu
 Tetsujin 28-go (2005) - Prof. Shikishima
 .hack//Roots (2006, TV series) - Ovan
 The Story of Saiunkoku (2006-2007, TV series) - Narrator / Shoka Hong / Dr. To / Governor of Haku Province / Sa Family Member 2
 Death Note (2007, TV series) - Takeshi Ooi
 Mobile Suit Gundam 00 (2007-2008, TV series) - Aeolia Schenberg
 Mobile Suit Gundam 00 the Movie: A Wakening of the Trailblazer (2010) - Aeolia Schenberg
 Black Lagoon: Roberta's Blood Trail (2010-2011, TV series) - Diego Jose San Fernando Lovelace

Animation
 Action Man (2000, TV Series) - Doctor X (new body)
X-Men: Evolution (2001-2003, TV Series) - Beast / Dr. Henry 'Hank' McCoy
 Dragon Booster (2004-2006, TV series) - Propheci / Reepyr
 Iron Man: Armored Adventures (2009-2012, TV series) - Controller
 Planet Hulk (2010, Movie) - Lavin Skee
 Ninjago (2011, TV series) - Samukai / Vex
 Littlest Pet Shop (2012-2016, TV series) - Roger Baxter
 Slugterra (2013, TV series) - Brimstone
 Barbie in Princess Power (2015, television movie) - Baron Von Ravendale

Video games
 Gundam Battle Assault 2 (1997) - Char Aznable
 Mobile Suit Gundam: Journey to Jaburo (2000) - Char Aznable
 Mobile Suit Gundam: Zeonic Front (2001) - Char Aznable
 Mobile Suit Gundam: Federation vs. Zeon (2001) - Char Aznable
 Mobile Suit Gundam: Encounters in Space (2003) - Char Aznable
 Mobile Suit Gundam: Gundam vs. Zeta Gundam (2004) - Char Aznable (lines recycled from Federation vs. Zeon)
 Dynasty Warriors: Gundam (2007) - Char Aznable / Quattro Bajeena (lines recycled for Dynasty Warriors: Gundam 2 and Dynasty Warriors: Gundam 3)
 Warhammer 40,000: Dawn of War – Soulstorm (2008) - Missionary, Confessor Turgenum March, Asdrubael Vect
 Prototype (2009) - Additional voices

Film and television
A Rose For Christmas (2017) - Hallmark 
 El Chavo del Ocho (1979, TV series) - Jaimito el Cartero (voice) (English dubbing)
 Timing (1985) - Steven
 Thirty Two Short Films About Glenn Gould (1993) - Broker #1
 Hard Core Logo (1996) - Mary's Husband
 Profile for Murder (1996) - Henry Mitchell
 The Outer Limits (1996-1999, TV series) - Curtis Sawyer / Commander Ivers / Detective Broder / Engineer
 The X-Files (1997, TV Series) - Rick Culver
 Dad's Week Off (1997, television movie) - Cop
 The Falling (1998) - Collins
 Seven Days (2000, TV series) - Col. Kurtner
 Chain of Fools (2000) - Senator Dove
 The Proposal (2001) - Zack Mallette
 3000 Miles to Graceland (2001) - Jefferson
 Pressure (2002) - Agent Frank Gruning
 Carrie (2002, television movie) - John Hargensen
 The Barber (2002) - Father Stiffler
 Stealing Sinatra (2003) - Billy
 See Grace Fly (2003) - Dominic's Father
 Miracle (2004) - Bruce Norris
 The Survivors Club (2004, television movie) - Vinnie Pesaturo
 Dead Zone (2004-2006, TV series) - Voting Machines Fixer
 Fantastic Four (2005) - Ned Cecil
 Crossing (2007) - Latham Hopkins
 Watchmen (2009) - Paul Klein
 Love Happens (2009) - Unicom CEO
 Transparency (2010) - Dale
 Dear Mr. Gacy (2010) - FBI Agent
 Repeaters (2010) - Mr. Greeber
 Rise of the Planet of the Apes (2011) - Jerk Driver
 Apollo 18 (2011) - Deputy Secretary of Defense
 Earth's Final Hours (2011, television movie) - Lockman
 Hit 'n Strum (2012) - Physician
 Independence Daysaster (2012) - General Moore
 Fringe (2012-2013, TV series) - Captain Windmark
 Yellowhead (2013) - Doctor
 Garage Sale Mystery: All That Glitters (2014, television movie) - Martin Foley
 Big Eyes (2014) - NY Society Man My Boyfriend's Dogs (2014) Restaurant co-owner
 Lost Solace (2016) - Chuck
 Countdown (2016) - Makarov
 Hello Destroyer (2016) - Judge
 Come and Find Me (2016) - Rezart
 Finding Father Christmas (2016, television movie) - Andrew McAndrick
 Little Pink House (2017) - Howard Munson
 Engaging Father Christmas (2017, television movie) - Andrew McAndrick
 In the Vineyard (2017, television movie) - Charles Baldwin
 The Professor (2018) - Doctor
 Marrying Father Christmas (2018, television movie) - Andrew McAndrick
 Chronicle Mysteries (2019, television movie) - Miles Lewiston
 Promiseland (2019) - Vasily
 Love in Winterland (2020) - Tom Wilson

References

External links
 
 
 

1956 births
2022 deaths
Canadian male voice actors
Canadian male film actors
Canadian male television actors
Canadian people of Hungarian descent
Deaths from brain cancer in Canada
20th-century Canadian male actors
21st-century Canadian male actors